The Texas Homeland Defense Service Medal is the seventh highest campaign/service award that may be issued to a service member of the Texas Military Forces.

Eligibility
The Texas Homeland Defense Service Medal is a one-time award to any member of the Texas Military Forces who:

 After 11 September 2001
Served on active duty orders under Texas command (Title 32) or under civilian authority
 Satisfactorily in a mission for defense of Texas

Authority 
The Texas Homeland Defense Service Medal was established by Representative Dan Flynn in House Bill Number 2897, authorized by the Eightieth Texas Legislature, and approved by Governor Rick Perry on 15 June 2007, effective the same date.

Description

The pendant is a Texas Ranger style medal with a gold outer ring, with a minuteman centered on the star. The gold outer ring is encircled by the words, “TEXAS HOMELAND DEFENSE SERVICE MEDAL”. The pendant is suspended by a ring from a silk moiré ribbon, 1-3/8 inches wide, composed of stripes of emerald green (15/32 of an inch), goldenrod (3/16 of an inch) and one azure blue (15/32 of an inch) in the center. An enameled minuteman 3/8 of an inch wide in circumscribing diameter is centered on the ribbon.

Notable Recipients

See also 

 Awards and decorations of the Texas Military
 Awards and decorations of the Texas government
 Texas Military Forces
 Texas Military Department
 List of conflicts involving the Texas Military

References 

Awards and decorations of the Texas Military Forces
Texas Military Forces
Texas Military Department